Floods of Fear is a 1958 British thriller film directed by Charles Crichton and starring Howard Keel, Anne Heywood and Harry H. Corbett.

Plot
During a flood, convicts Donovan (Howard Keel) and Peebles (Cyril Cusack) escape, but they become marooned in a house, along with one of their prison guards Sharkey (Harry H. Corbett) and a young woman Elizabeth Mathews (Anne Heywood) who lives there. Having managed to escape, Donovan is determined to prove his innocence and that he was wrongly jailed for murdering a woman.

Cast
 Howard Keel as Donovan 
 Anne Heywood as Elizabeth Matthews 
 Cyril Cusack as Peebles 
 Harry H. Corbett as Sharkey 
 John Crawford as Jack Murphy 
 Eddie Byrne as Sheriff 
 John Phillips as Dr. Matthews
Mark Baker as Watchman
James Dyrenforth as Mayor
Jack Lester as Businessman
Peter Madden as Banker
Guy Kingsley Poynter as Deputy Sheriff
Gordon Tanner as Lt-Colonel
Robert Mackenzie as Police Captain
Vivian Matalon as Farmer
Gordon Sterne as Farmer
Bill Edwards as 1st Deputy
Graydon Gould as 2nd Deputy
Kevin Scott as 3rd Deputy
Ed Devereaux as Sergeant

Production
Filming started in London on 23 April 1958.

Howard Keel recalled the filming in his autobiography Only Make Believe: My Life in Show Business: "All the flood scenes were filmed on one of the large stages at Pinewood Studios. The water had to be both dirty and cold, and it was. They couldn't heat it for fear it might get rancid. That was another tough picture. Anne Heywood never once protested about the water. [Charles] Crichton, who had a great sense of humor, had directed some very funny pictures. Cyril Cusack and I were good friends. We had a little contest over Anne. He was a real cutie, as well as a hell of an actor, but I won out."

Crichton said he was "not proud of the picture" but was proud of the fact "that it looks like the Mississippi in flood and it was all shot in the studio at Pinewood." He said he had to make the film "because I wanted money" and that he had to rewrite the whole film.

Critical reception
Variety called it:
One of Britain’s most determined Attempts to woo the U.S. market. Not only does it have Howard Keel as its male star, but the meller is unabashedly set in the U.S. The film has a novel setting, but an old idea, and corny dialog doesn’t help the character® to develop overmuch. However, there is some sound acting and the production quality is tops. It adds up to reasonable entertainment, but it is one of those annoy¬ ing pix that should—and could— have been much better. It is questionable whether its marquee value is sufficiently strong to lure Yank patrons.
TV Guide wrote, "Heywood is a joy to watch as she stands up to the impending aquatic doom" ; while the Radio Times wrote, "well performed by an able cast Dallas star Howard Keel, Steptoe and Son's Harry H Corbett, Cyril Cusack and, in particular, damsel in distress Anne Heywood this is typical, and unremarkable, British 1950s B-movie fare."

References

1959 films
British thriller films
1950s thriller films
Films directed by Charles Crichton
Films based on American novels
Flood films
1950s English-language films
1950s British films